Nebiy Mekonnen (born in Nazret) is an Ethiopian poet, journalist, playwright, and translator. He is also the co-founder and editor-in-chief of the weekly newspaper Addis Admas. He is known for translating Gone with the Wind into Amharic onto three thousand cigarette-paper pieces while imprisoned. His translation is titled Negem Lela Ken New (in Amharic) or Tomorrow is Another Day (in English). At the time of its publication, it was one of the longest books ever published in Amharic.

He was a member of the Ethiopian Peoples' Revolutionary Party and was imprisoned for nearly eight years, from 1977 to 1985, during the Derg Regime's Red Terror. Some of Nebiy Mekonnen's poems have been translated into English and French.

Nebiy is also famous for writing observations. His series published in Addis Admas entitled Yegna Sew Beamerika (An Ethiopian in the U.S.) was a well-read series that was eagerly anticipated every week on his paper.

References

 

Possibly living people
Year of birth missing
20th-century Ethiopian writers
Ethiopian poets
Ethiopian translators
Amharic-language writers